Stop Staring at Me! is the fifth comedy album released by prank call artists, the Jerky Boys. It was released on May 18, 1999, and was the final Jerky Boys album released by Mercury Records.

Track listing
 "Special Delivery"
 "Willie The Jackass"
 "1000 Chickens Trilogy (Part 1)"
 "Nuts To You"
 "Tarbash's Cab Trouble"
 "Masturbation Box"
 "Rosine Likes Balloons"
 "1000 Chickens Trilogy (Part 2)"
 "Hucklebuck"
 "Duck Cleaning"
 "Super Gay"
 "I Pickle They"
 "Pork Fried Rice"
 "Hair Vitamins"
 "Burial Vaults"
 "Marriage Insurance"
 "Nam Hu?"
 "Send A Salami To Your Boy In The Army"
 "Pick Up Pie"
 "Big Hock"
 "Synchronized Swimming"
 "Frank's Pickles"
 "You Wanna Scrap?"
 "1000 Chickens Trilogy (Part 3)"

References

1999 albums
The Jerky Boys albums
1990s comedy albums
Mercury Records albums